Pushprajgarh Assembly constituency is one of the 230 Vidhan Sabha (Legislative Assembly) constituencies of Madhya Pradesh state in central India. It is a segment of Shahdol (Lok Sabha constituency).

It is in Anuppur district, near the state border with Chhattisgarh.

Members of Legislative Assembly

Election results

2013 Vidhan Sabha

1977 Vidhan Sabha
 Hazari Singh (JNP) : 12,282 votes  
 Dalbir Singh (INC) : 3,851

References

Assembly constituencies of Madhya Pradesh
Anuppur district